The 1907 Victorian state election was held in the Australian state of Victoria on Friday, 15 March 1907 to elect 45 of the 65 members of the state's Legislative Assembly. The other 20 seats were uncontested.

The election was in one member districts, using first past the post (plurality) voting.

Background
Ministerialists were a group of members of parliament who supported a government in office but were not bound by tight party discipline. Ministerialists represented loose pre-party groupings who held seats in state parliaments up to 1914. Such members ran for office as independents or under a variety of political labels but saw themselves as linked to other candidates by their support for a particular premier or government.

Results

Legislative Assembly 

|}

See also
Members of the Victorian Legislative Assembly, 1907–1908

References

1907 elections in Australia
Elections in Victoria (Australia)
1900s in Victoria (Australia)
March 1907 events